is a retired Japanese sprint runner and professional baseball player. He competed at the 1964 and 1968 Olympics in the 100 m and 4 × 100 m relay events, but was eliminated in semifinals on all occasions. At the 1968 Games he ran his personal best in all competitions (10.24–10.34 seconds depending on the wind).

After the 1968 Olympics Iijima became a professional baseball player. He retired in 1971 and for one year worked as a baseball coach. He later ran a sporting goods store in his native Mito.

References

1944 births
Living people
Japanese male sprinters
Olympic athletes of Japan
Athletes (track and field) at the 1964 Summer Olympics
Athletes (track and field) at the 1968 Summer Olympics
Asian Games medalists in athletics (track and field)
Athletes (track and field) at the 1962 Asian Games
Athletes (track and field) at the 1966 Asian Games
Asian Games silver medalists for Japan
Asian Games bronze medalists for Japan
Universiade medalists in athletics (track and field)
Medalists at the 1962 Asian Games
Medalists at the 1966 Asian Games
Universiade gold medalists for Japan
Medalists at the 1965 Summer Universiade
20th-century Japanese people